Prolimacodes is a genus of slug caterpillar moths in the moth family Limacodidae. The genus was erected by William Schaus in 1896. There are at least seven described species in Prolimacodes, found in North and Central America.

Species
These species belong to the genus Prolimacodes:
 Prolimacodes badia (Hubner, 1822) (skiff moth)
 Prolimacodes dividua Dyar, 1907
 Prolimacodes lilalia Dyar, 1937
 Prolimacodes polygona Hering & Hopp, 1927
 Prolimacodes triangulifera Schaus, 1896
 Prolimacodes trigona Edwards, 1882 (western skiff moth)
 Prolimacodes undifera

References

Further reading

 

Limacodidae